Johnsmith is an American singer-songwriter, based in Wisconsin. In January 2011, he was nominated for the 10th Annual Independent Music Awards in the Blues category for his song "Jay Bird". He uses one name.

Discography

Gravity of Grace (2009)
Break Me Open (2006)
Kickin' This Stone (2004)
Traveler (2002)
To the Four Directions (2000)
Hole in the Clouds (1998)
The Longing Road (2014)

External links

References

<references </ >

Year of birth missing (living people)
Living people
Singer-songwriters from Wisconsin